Polovtsevo is a rural locality (a settlement) in Novokhopyorsk, Novokhopyorsky District, Voronezh Oblast, Russia. The population was 585 as of 2010. There are 12 streets.

Geography 
Polovtsevo is located 8 km northeast of Novokhopyorsk (the district's administrative centre) by road. Zamelnichny is the nearest rural locality.

References 

Populated places in Novokhopyorsky District